Centerprise Women's Café was a women-only space at the Centerprise Community Centre in Hackney. The Women's Café was held on the last Friday of every month, with a mix of scheduled performers and an open mic. Every other month, Word Up was for black women only.

History
After a series of lesbian reading sessions at the London Women's Centre had ended, Bernadette Halpin helped found the first Word Up Women's Café at the Centerprise Community Centre in Hackney in February 1991. The Women's Café soon gained a reputation as the only women-only performance space in London for writer, musicians, dancers and comedians. Six months later Dorothea Smartt joined Halpin at Centerprise as the Black Literature Worker, and they started a night reserved for black women performers. In 1993 Smartt and Halpin co-edited an anthology of lesbian poets who had performed at Word Up, Words from the Women's Café: Lesbian Poetry from Word Up,  including work by Patience Agbabi and Valerie Mason-John. 

The last café night was held in 1994, after Smartt and Halpin had both left Centerprise.

References

1991 establishments in England
1994 disestablishments in England
Event venues established in 1991
Performance art venues
Feminism and the arts
Organisations based in the London Borough of Hackney